The Instituto Nacional del Derecho de Autor is Mexico's Copyright office. It works at a federal level.

References

Law of Mexico
Copyright law organizations